This is an alphabetical list of useful timber trees, indigenous (cultivated and natural) and exotic, growing in the Gauteng area of South Africa. These trees range in size up to some 1.5m DBH, such as Cedrus deodara, the Himalayan Cedar. Hobbyists will seek out even small pieces of highly valued timber, such as Buxus macowanii, the South African counterpart of Buxus sempervirens, for turnery or the making of boxes and small items. Despite the wealth of useful woods available in Gauteng, most of the trees, felled or fallen, are dumped or cut into short lengths for fuel. Trees grown in urban or suburban environments are rarely pruned and are consequently often knotty. Timber frequently holds nails, wire and spikes, attesting to a variety of abuse during the lifetime of a tree, and requiring the use of a metal detector by the sawmiller. Garden cuttings and dead leaves are occasionally piled next to trees and burnt, leaving charred scars and inclusions.

Acacia ataxacantha DC.
Acacia caffra (Thunb.) Willd.
Acacia elata Benth.
Acacia galpinii Burtt Davy
Acacia karroo Hayne
Acacia mearnsii De Wild.
Acacia melanoxylon R.Br.
Acacia robusta Burch.
Acacia sieberiana var. woodii (Burtt Davy) Keay & Brenan
Acacia xanthophloea Benth.
Acer negundo L.
Acer palmatum Thunb.
Aesculus hippocastanum L.
Afrocarpus falcatus (Thunb.) C.N.Page
Ailanthus altissima (Mill.) Swingle
Albizia odoratissima (L.f.) Benth.
Araucaria araucana (Molina) K.Koch
Araucaria bidwillii Hook.
Araucaria heterophylla (Salisb.) Franco
Bauhinia variegata L.
Betula pendula Roth
Brachychiton acerifolius (A.Cunn. ex G.Don) F.Muell.
Brachychiton discolor F.Muell.
Brachychiton populneus (Schott & Endl.) R.Br.
Brachylaena rotundata S.Moore
Buddleja saligna Willd.
Buxus macowanii Oliv.
Caesalpinia ferrea C.Mart.
Calodendrum capense (L.f.) Thunb.
Carya illinoinensis (Wangenh.) K.Koch
Castanea sativa Mill.
Castanospermum australe A.Cunn. & C.Fraser
Casuarina cunninghamiana Miq.
Casuarina equisetifolia L.
Cedrus atlantica (Endl.) Manetti ex Carrière
Cedrus deodara (Roxb. ex D.Don) G.Don
Cedrus libani A.Rich.
Celtis africana Burm.f.
Celtis sinensis Pers.
Ceratonia siliqua L.
Cinnamomum camphora (L.) J.Presl
Citharexylum spinosum L.
Corymbia maculata (Hook.) K.D.Hill & L.A.S.Johnson
Cryptomeria japonica (Thunb. ex L.f.) D.Don
Cupressus arizonica Greene
Cupressus macrocarpa Hartw.
Cupressus sempervirens L.
Diospyros virginiana L.
Dodonaea viscosa (L.) Jacq.
Dombeya rotundifolia (Hochst.) Planch.	
Ekebergia capensis Sparrm.
Eriobotrya japonica (Thunb.) Lindl.
Eucalyptus camaldulensis Dehnh.
Eucalyptus cinerea F.Muell. ex Benth.
Eucalyptus cloeziana F.Muell.
Eucalyptus diversicolor F.Muell.
Eucalyptus grandis W.Hill
Eucalyptus marginata Donn ex Sm.
Eucalyptus paniculata Sm.
Eucalyptus sideroxylon A.Cunn. ex Woolls
Faidherbia albida (Delile) A.Chev. (Acacia albida Delile)	
Fraxinus americana L.
Gleditsia triacanthos L.
Grevillea robusta A.Cunn. ex R.Br.
Hakea salicifolia (Vent.) B.L.Burtt
Jacaranda mimosifolia D.Don 
Juglans regia L.
Lagerstroemia indica L.
Laurus nobilis L.
Ligustrum vulgare L.
Liquidambar styraciflua L.
Liriodendron tulipifera L.
Magnolia grandiflora L.
Melaleuca argentea W.Fitzg.
Melaleuca quinquenervia (Cav.) S.T.Blake
Melia azedarach L.
Morus nigra L.
Nuxia congesta R.Br. ex Fresen.
Olea europaea subsp. cuspidata (Wall. & G.Don) Cif.
Olinia emarginata Burtt Davy
Pappea capensis Eckl. & Zeyh.
Peltophorum africanum Sond.
Persea americana Mill.
Phyllostachys bambusoides Siebold & Zucc.
Pinus canariensis C.Sm.
Pinus halepensis Mill.
Pinus patula Schiede ex Schltdl. & Cham.
Pinus radiata D.Don
Pinus roxburghii Sarg.
Pittosporum viridiflorum Sims
Platanus spp.
Podocarpus latifolius (Thunb.) R.Br. ex Mirb.	
Podocarpus henkelii Stapf ex Dallim. & B.D.Jacks.	
Populus × canescens (Aiton) Sm.
Populus deltoides Marshall
Prunus armeniaca L.
Prunus laurocerasus L.
Prunus persica (L.) Batsch
Psidium guajava L.
Pyrus communis L.
Quercus ilex L.
Quercus palustris Münchh.
Quercus robur L.
Quercus rugosa Née
Quercus suber L.
Robinia pseudacacia L.
Salix babylonica L.
Schinus molle L.
Searsia lancea (L.f.) F.A.Barkley
Searsia leptodictya (Diels) T.S.Yi, A.J.Mill. & J.Wen
Sequoia sempervirens (D.Don) Endl.
Styphnolobium japonicum (L.) Schott
Syncarpia glomulifera (Sm.) Nied.
Syzygium paniculatum Gaertn.
Taxodium distichum (L.) Rich.
Tarchonanthus camphoratus L.
Tecoma stans (L.) Juss. ex Kunth
Tipuana tipu (Benth.) Kuntze
Toona ciliata M.Roem. (Cedrela toona Roxb. ex Rottler)
Trichilia emetica Vahl
Ulmus parvifolia Jacq.
Ulmus minor Mill. 
Vepris lanceolata (Lam.) G. Don
Virgilia divaricata Adamson
Zanthoxylum capense (Thunb.) Harv.
Ziziphus mucronata Willd.

Gallery

External links
The Wood Database
Rare Woods and Veneers

Gauteng
Johannesburg
Pretoria
Lists of biota of South Africa
Lists of trees